St Joseph’s Football & Netball Club Inc, nicknamed the Joeys, is an Australian rules football and netball club based in the residential suburb of Herne Hill, Victoria. The club teams currently compete in the Geelong Football Netball League, the major regional league in Geelong.

History
With less than four weeks to the start of the 1973 season junior club St Joseph’s was told that the Geelong & District Football League had passed a motion that all affiliated clubs had to field teams in all the main sections,(Seniors, Reserves, Under 18 and under 16). The club had to find a ground, a coach, committee and forty senior players necessary to keep the club afloat.
Martin Bourke was appointed coach and Drew Reserve was obtained as a home ground.

They joined the Geelong & District Football League and won their first flag in 1982. In those days promotion to the Geelong Football League was automatic as was demotion. They were promoted, demoted then promoted again in three years.
Since then it has stayed in the Geelong Football League since 1985.

Premierships
Geelong Football League (4)
1989, 2015, 2017, 2018
Geelong & District Football League (2)
1982, 1984

Players

Notable players 
Over thirty players have gone on to play AFL including
Matthew Scarlett - 
Barry Stoneham - 
Cameron Ling - 
Taylor Adams - GWS Giants and Collingwood Football Club
Nick Maxwell - Collingwood Football Club 
Sam Walsh - Carlton Football Club
Alex Witherden-West Coast Eagles
Tom Doedee- Adelaide Crows

Current squad (2022)

Bibliography
 Cat Country: History of Football In The Geelong Region by John Stoward -

References

External links

 Official website

Geelong Football League clubs
1973 establishments in Australia
Australian rules football clubs established in 1973
Geelong & District Football League clubs
Sports clubs established in 1973
Netball teams in Geelong
Australian rules football clubs in Geelong